Arda Özçimen (born 8 January 2002), is a Turkish professional footballer who plays as a goalkeeper for Göztepe.

Professional career
Özçimen started playing football at the youth academy of Fethiyespor, before moving to Göztepe's youth academy in 2013. He signed his first professional contract with Göztepe on 6 August 2018. Özçimen made his professional debut with Göztepe in a 1–1 Süper Lig win over Fatih Karagümrük on 20 April 2021, saving a penalty on his debut.

International career
Özçimen is a youth international for Turkey, having represented the Turkey U14s, U15s, U16s, U17s, and U18s.

Personal life
Özçimen's father, Yüksel Özçimen, was also a professional football goalkeeper and is the current goalkeeper coach for Ankara Demirspor. His brother, Arda Özçimen, is a semi-pro footballer in Turkey.

References

External links
 
 
 

2002 births
Living people
People from Konak
Turkish footballers
Turkey youth international footballers
Göztepe S.K. footballers
Süper Lig players
Association football goalkeepers